Ngbaka (Ngbàkà) is a Gbaya language spoken by just over a million people in the Democratic Republic of the Congo. It is a regionally important language, used by the Gilima, Ngbundu, Mbandja and Mono peoples, and is taught in primary schools; 10% are literate in Ngbaka.

Ngbaka is a common local ethnic name; the language may be distinguished from other languages called "Ngbaka" as Ngbaka Gbaya or Ngbaka Minagende.

There are no significant dialectal differences within Ngbaka, and it may be mutually intelligible with members of the Manza dialect cluster.

Phonology

Consonants 

 The trill /r/ mainly occurs in ideophones, in both initial and final position. When it occurs in loanwords, it is often pronounced as a lateral [l].
 The glottal stop /ʔ/ mostly occurs before word-initial vowels.
 Sounds /ŋ͡m, ʔ, h, w/, do not appear in intervocalic position.
 /ŋ/ does not appear in word-initial position
 The fricative /f/ can be pronounced in the western dialects as a voiceless stop [p].
 The voiceless stop /k/ can be pronounced as a voiced stop [ɡ] in the western dialects.

Vowels

Writing system

Nasalisation is indicated with a tilde on the vowel : .

Les tons des syllables sont indiqués avec des diacritiques lorsqu’il y a ambigüité :
 the high tone is indicated with the acute accent :  ;
 the low tone is indicated with the grave accent  :  ;
 the following tones are not usually indicated in the spelling but may be indicated in some linguistic works :
 the medium tone with the vertical line above :  ;
 the falling tone with the circumflex accent :  ;
 the rising tone with the caron/hacek : .

References

External links
Ngbaka at Ghent University

Gbaya languages
Languages of the Democratic Republic of the Congo